is a Japanese tennis player.

Imamura has a career-high WTA singles ranking of 497, achieved on 19 December 2022, and a career-high WTA doubles ranking of 360, achieved on 09 January 2023.

In 2023 Imamura won her first major ITF title in the doubles draw with her Japanese partner Erina Hayashi at the ITF $ 40,000 tournament in Bhopal, India. The Japanese duo defeated Russia's Ekaterina Makarova and Ekaterina Reyngold 6–3, 7–6(3) in the final.

References

External links
 
 

2002 births
Living people
Japanese female tennis players
21st-century Japanese women
Sportspeople from Kyoto